Martin Peninsula is a peninsula about 96 km (60) mi long and 32 km (20 mi) wide that is ice-covered except for a few rock outcrops along its margins, located between Getz Ice Shelf and Dotson Ice Shelf on the coast of Marie Byrd Land, Antarctica.  The farthest point of the peninsula is Jacobsen Head.

Delineated from aerial photographs taken by USN Operation Highjump in January 1947. Named by US-ACAN after Col. Lawrence Martin, USA (Ret.), American geographer and authority on Antarctic exploration with the Library of Congress; member of US-SCAN, 1943–46.

Peninsulas of Antarctica
Landforms of Marie Byrd Land